Steve Klosterman is a volleyball coach, currently Assistant at Hofstra University, a 2-time NCAA All American, NCAA Championship MVP, Puerto Rican Superior League Championship MVP, and former international player from the United States. He finished UCLA as the #1 points producer in the “rally scoring” era, and 4th overall in the long history of the most dominant collegiate men's program in the sport that's won 19 NCAA Championships.

Career

Coaching:
 Hofstra University Women's Volleyball, Assistant Coach, 
Assistant (vol) Coach at Loyola of Chicago, Women Fall, 2017
Loyola of Chicago Men's: Camp Coach Summer, 2018
 High School Head Coach 
Club Head coach and technical advisor, at Chicago Bounce
10 years coaching at HBC Club in So. California
 UCLA Men's, (vol) Assistant Coach

Los Angeles Times article on Taking a very inexperienced team to the CIF Playoffs

INTERNATIONAL PLAYER

2014 — SKV Havířov, Czech Republic
2012 — Played for Nuevos Gigantes de Carolina of the Puerto Rico Superior League
2011 — Played in Toulouse, France Joined the Spacers who were already losing many matches and in jeopardy of being dropped down to the B league. Helped win enough of the season's 2nd half matches to keep the team in the A League, including defeating the eventual league champion in a crucial match.
2010 — Played in Doha, Qatar with Police United. Helped team to its All Time best season with a 3rd-place finish
2009 — Member of USAV Training Team. Member of team that defeated Canadian National team.
2007-08  — Named MVP of the Puerto Rican Championships after leading his Naranjito Changos to the Puerto Rican Professional League Championships.

UCLA

2007 — UCLA, (University of California at Los Angeles). Finished UCLA as the #1 points producer in the “rally scoring” era. UCLA is the most storied program in US collegiate volleyball with 19 national championships, by far the most of all teams.

Earned 2nd Team All-America honors from the AVCA and Volleyball Magazine. 
Was a 3rd Team All-America selection by Spike/Volleyball.
Second team All-MPSF selection.
Led the team in kills (472) and points (553.0). 
Finished his UCLA career ranked first on the RALLY SCORING ERA kills chart, and fourth on the ALL-TIME kills list with 1,513 and ended his career ranked second on the career rally-scoring era aces chart with 79.
Recorded 76 career double-digit kill matches, including 27 in 2007 and 21 straight.
Ranked seventh in points per game (4.9) and kpg (4.16).
Scored 20 or more points 14 times.
Selected AVCA National Player of the Week, and MPSF Player of the Week (2/26) after impressive victories against CS Northridge and UCSB.
Against CSN (2/21), he pounded a career-high of 31 kills w/ no errors, including 22 straight through three games.
His total of 35 points that night was a career-high.

2006 — Named Most Outstanding Player of the NCAA Championships after scoring 32 points and hitting .379 in two matches at the tournament.

In spite of rehabbing the first half of the season from surgery and playing sparingly on a strict "pitch count" for half the season, he earned Second-Team All-America honors from Spike/Volleyball and Volleyball magazines.
Named All-MPSF Honorable Mention.
Entering the season he boasted 49 career double-digit kill matches, including 25 the previous season.
Ranked ninth on the all-time UCLA career kills list with 1,041 entering his senior year.
Ranked first on the UCLA career rally-scoring kills chart.
His 466 kills last season ranked seventh in UCLA history.
Also on the career rally-scoring charts, he ranked first in attacks (2,268), fourth in solo blocks (28), fifth in block assists (170) and total blocks (198), sixth in digs (345), eighth in aces (50), and 10th in attack percentage (.287).
On the season charts, he ranked first in kills (466) and attacks (1016), and second in points (528.0).
Ranked in a tie for 19th nationally at 4.12 kpg.
Recorded his career high of 32 points and 30 kills (.390) vs. CSN (4/15).
Blocked a career high of nine balls vs. USC (3/17).
Also recorded 27 kills (.511) and 28.5 points vs. Pepperdine (3/1).
Recorded a double-double vs. CSN (2/10) with 12 kills and a career high of 14 digs. 

All of this was accomplished in a return from rehab season after surgery, rehab that greatly restricted playing matches and swing counts until the second half of the season.

The Daily Bruin did this story on his recovery and resurgence:

Bouncing back into his game 5. 

2005 — Led the Bruins to the NCAA National Championship match. Lead the Bruins with 20 kills (.308) vs. UH (2/25) and added four block assists for a season-high of 22.0 points.
Slammed 17 kills (.500) vs. UOP (2/19) with two block assists.
Pounded 16 kills (.517) vs. CS Northridge (4/6) and added an ace and two total blocks.
Tied his career-high for total blocks (5) twice.
Established a season-high of eight digs vs. UCI (1/15).
Recorded eight double-digit kill matches.
Played the entire season with a shoulder labrum injury, underwent successful shoulder surgery in June 2005.

2004 — Earned MPSF Honorable Mention honors as a freshman.
Led the Bruins with 397.0 points, 4.6 ppg, 3.8 kpg and 346 total kills.
Set season bests for points (25.5 vs. CSN, 1/10), kills (24 vs. UCSB, 2/18), total blocks (5 twice) and aces (3 vs. CSN, 1/10).
Led the team in kills and points 10 times and boasted eight matches of 20 or more points.
Recorded 16 double-digit kill matches and three matches with 20 or more kills.
Had two matches of 40 or more attempts, including 42 attempts vs. Stanford (1/16).
Tied a single-match UCLA record by hitting .900 (9-0-10) vs. La Verne (1/14).
In nine matches, he recorded a hitting percentage of .400 or better.  Suffered a torn labrum of right hitting shoulder 3/4s of way through season. Treatment was proposed by medical staff as rest rather than surgery.

High School
High School—Three-sport, six-time varsity letterman at St. John Bosco in Bellflower, CA (9-10), and Marina HS in Huntington Beach, CA (11-12) ... Played QB in football, basketball and volleyball ... Inducted into Marina HS Hall of Fame. Three-time first-team All-League performer in volleyball, who was voted the O.C. Register newspaper "Player of the Year," 1st team All-CIF and Sunset League MVP as a senior. Once slammed 72 kills in a match, and boasted 12 matches with 45 kills or more. Three time High School All American.  Deemed the top volleyball recruit in the nation, by the Los Angeles Times.

USA VOLLEYBALL —Member of the USA High Performance Team, the USA Youth National Team, the USA Jr. National Team, the World University Games training team (twice), USAV Training Team ...

CLUB: USAV - Two-time, Back-to-Back Junior Olympics 18s "Most Valuable Player''' Open Division, Team LBC. Lead his team to an unprecedented three straight USAV Junior Olympics GOLD medals. 2 18s and the 17s Open Gold Medals, Team LBC

Coaching mentors
UCLA: Al Scates
USAV: Hugh McCutcheon, John Speraw

References 

 Daily Bruin: Bouncing Back Into His Game http://dailybruin.com/2006/04/26/bouncing-back-into-his-game/
 
 L.A.Times: Former college volleyball MVP starts from scratch as coach at Orangewood Academy https://www.latimes.com/sports/highschool/varsity-times/la-sp-steve-klosterman-sondheimer-20170504-story.html

External links
 Personal website

American men's volleyball players
1984 births
American people of Dutch descent
Living people
UCLA Bruins men's volleyball players
Hofstra Pride coaches